The 2022 Città di Forlì III was a professional tennis tournament played on indoor hard courts. It was the fifth edition of the tournament which was part of the 2022 ATP Challenger Tour. It took place in Forlì, Italy between 17 and 23 January 2022.

Singles main-draw entrants

Seeds

 1 Rankings as of 10 January 2022.

Other entrants
The following players received wildcards into the singles main draw:
  Matteo Arnaldi
  Stefano Napolitano
  Andrea Pellegrino

The following player received entry into the singles main draw using a protected ranking:
  Filippo Baldi

The following player received entry into the singles main draw as a special exempt:
  Jack Draper

The following players received entry into the singles main draw as alternates:
  Denis Istomin
  Wu Tung-lin

The following players received entry from the qualifying draw:
  Marius Copil
  Antoine Escoffier
  Borna Gojo
  Lukáš Rosol
  Evgenii Tiurnev
  Kaichi Uchida

The following player received entry as a lucky loser:
  Evan Furness

Champions

Singles

 Pavel Kotov def.  Quentin Halys 7–5, 6–7(5–7), 6–3.

Doubles

 Victor Vlad Cornea /  Fabian Fallert def.  Jonáš Forejtek /  Jelle Sels 6–4, 6–7(6–8), [10–7].

References

Città di Forlì III
January 2022 sports events in Italy
2022 in Italian sport